Sigrid Maria Elisabet Rausing (born 29 January 1962) is a Swedish philanthropist, anthropologist and publisher. She is the founder of the Sigrid Rausing Trust, one of the United Kingdom's largest philanthropic foundations, and owner of Granta magazine and Granta Books.

Early life
Rausing grew up in Lund, Sweden, and studied History at the University of York between 1983 and 1986. She has an MSc in Social Anthropology from University College London in 1987. She continued with a PhD focusing on post-Soviet anthropology, and did her fieldwork on a collective farm in Estonia, in 1993-4.  In 1997, she was awarded a PhD in Social Anthropology from the Department of Social Anthropology at University College London followed by an honorary post-doctorate in the same department.

Career
Rausing's book, a monograph based on her PhD, History, Memory, and Identity in Post-Soviet Estonia: The End of a Collective Farm, was published by Oxford University Press in 2004. The book was preceded by a range of articles in scholarly journals, including Ethnologie Francaise.

Everything Is Wonderful, a personal memoir of her year in Estonia researching the remnants of the Estonian Swedish community, was published by Grove Atlantic in the US, and by Albert Bonniers förlag in Sweden, in spring 2014.

Rausing writes occasional columns for the New Statesman, and her articles on human rights have appeared in the Guardian and the Sunday Times.

In spring 2005, with her husband, Eric Abraham and publisher Philip Gwyn-Jones she founded the publishing house, Portobello Books, and that Autumn she acquired Granta, a literary journal, and its book publishing arm. She is now the publisher of both Granta magazine and Granta Books, including its imprint Portobello Books.

In February 2013 she was judged to be one of the 100 most powerful women in the United Kingdom by Woman's Hour on BBC Radio 4.

In January 2016 Rausing was the guest on BBC Radio 4’s Desert Island Discs. Her favourite music choice was Chopin’s "Études Op. 10, No. 1 in C major". Other choices were: "Hallelujah" by k.d. lang, "The Vatican Rag" by Tom Lehrer, "Bird on the Wire" by Leonard Cohen, "Sister Rosetta Goes Before Us" by Alison Krauss and Robert Plant, "The Last Goodbye" by The Kills, "I Get a Kick Out of You" by Ella Fitzgerald, and "Le Cygne (The Swan)" by Camille Saint-Saëns. Her book choice was Mansfield Park by Jane Austen and her luxury item was the British Library.

Philanthropy
Rausing set up the charitable trust the Sea Foundation in 1988. In 1996 she transferred the funds to the Ruben and Elisabeth Rausing Trust, named after her grandparents; the trust was renamed the Sigrid Rausing Trust in 2003 and by 2014, had distributed approximately £208.3 million to human rights organisations globally.

In 2004 she was the joint winner of the International Service Human Rights Award, in the Global Human Rights Defender category. In 2005 she won a Beacon Special Award for philanthropy. In 2006 she was awarded the Women's Funding Network's 'Changing the Face of Philanthropy' Award.

She is a judge on the jury of the Per Anger Prize for human rights defenders, and an emeritus board member of the Order of the Teaspoon, a Swedish organisation against political and religious extremism.

She was the judge of the Amnesty International Media Awards in 2009 and 2010. She serves on the advisory board of the Coalition for the International Criminal Court, and is an Emeritus member of the international board of Human Rights Watch.

She is a former trustee of Charleston, in Sussex, the museum which is the former home of Duncan Grant and Vanessa Bell. In 2010 she was made an Honorary Fellow of the London School of Economics. In 2011 she was the recipient of the Morrell Fellowship from the University of York. In 2012 she was a judge of the Index on Censorship Media Awards.

In June 2014 she was elected an Honorary Fellow of St Antony's College, Oxford and in 2021 she was awarded an Honorary Doctor of Literature (DLit) from UCL.

Rausing is a supporter of Hope Not Hate. On 1 December 2018 the Sigrid Rausing Trust began a grant of £450,000 over 3 years to Hope Not Hate. By that point, Hope Not Hate had received £615,000 from the Sigrid Rausing Trust.

Personal life
Rausing is married to South African-born TV, film and theatre producer Eric Abraham. They own Aubrey House in Holland Park, and the Coignafearn estate, in the Monadh Liath, in the Highlands of Scotland.

Bibliography

Author

Editor

See also
 Rausing family

References

External links
Sigrid Rausing Trust

1962 births
Living people
Publishers (people) from London
Alumni of the University of York
Alumni of University College London
Philanthropists from London
Women philanthropists
Swedish emigrants to the United Kingdom
Swedish philanthropists
Sigrid
Honorary Fellows of the London School of Economics